Ettuthikkum Para is a 2020 Tamil language drama film directed by Keera. The film stars Samuthirakani  and Chandini Tamilarasan in the lead roles with Nitish Veera and Ramdoss in pivotal roles.

Synopsis 
Ambedkar (Samuthirakani), a social activist, gets involved in the dark side of the government. As a result, his son and friends are killed. A lower caste individual (Nitish Veera)  desires to marry a girl from a higher caste. A woman (Chandini Tamilarasan) leaves for Chennai to marry the man of her choice. Two senior citizens await the day of their death. Pattakkathi (Ramdoss) is in need of Rs 20,000 to save his son's life. How these five separate stories interact forms the rest of the story.

Cast 
 Samuthirakani as Ambedkar 
 Chandini Tamilarasan as Divyasree Kumaravel
 Ramdoss as Pattakkathi 
 Nitish Veera
 Samiksha as Ambedkar's wife
 Vazhakku En Muthuraman as the Lord of Murder
 Shaju Mon
 Savanthika
 Venba
 Supergood Subramani
Sampath Ram
 Malaysia Param as Paalkarar

Production 
The film is directed by Keera, who previously directed Pachai Engira Kaathu (2012) and Merlin (2018) and is about honour killings. The film began production in 2018  under the name Para before the makers decided to change the name to Ettuthikkum Para as the name para was similar to a caste name. Samuthirakani was signed to play a pivotal role in the film. The film takes place in the course of twelve hours and is revolves around a group of different kind of people that are united by chance. The film was shot in North Chennai and Nagercoil. The film highlights the negative aspects of honour killings based on caste.

Soundtrack 
The songs were composed by M. S. Sreekanth.

Release  
The film was  released in March 2020.

Dinamalar gave the film a rating of one out of five. A critic from Maalai Malar praised the story, the acting of the cast, the music, and the cinematography.

References

External links 

Films shot in Chennai